List of eukaryotic species that belong to picoplankton, meaning one of their cell dimensions is smaller than 3 μm.

Autotrophic species

Chlorophyta

Chlorophyceae

 Stichococcus cylindricus Butcher, 3 - 4.5 μm, brackish

Pedinophyceae
 Marsupiomonas pelliculata Jones et al., 3 - 3 μm, brackish-marine
 Resultor micron Moestrup, 1.5 - 2.5 μm, marine

Prasinophyceae
 Bathycoccus prasinos Eikrem et Throndsen, 1.5 - 2.5 μm, marine
 Crustomastix stigmatica Zingone, 3 - 5 μm, marine
 Dolichomastix lepidota Manton, 2.5 - 2.5 μm, marine
 Dolichomastix eurylepidea Manton, 3 μm, marine
 Dolichomastix tenuilepis Throndsen et Zingone, 3 - 4.5 μm, marine
 Mantoniella squamata Desikachary, 3 - 5 μm, marine
 Micromonas pusilla Manton et Parke, 1 - 3 μm, marine
 Ostreococcus tauri Courties et Chrétiennot-Dinet, 0.8 - 1.1 μm, marine
 Picocystis salinarum Lewin, 2 - 3 μm, hypersaline
 Prasinococcus capsulatus Miyashita et Chihara, 3 - 5.5 μm, marine
 Prasinoderma coloniale Hasegawa et Chihara, 2.5 - 5.5 μm, marine
 Pseudoscourfieldia marina Manton, 3 - 3.5 μm, marine
 Pycnococcus provasolii Guillard, 1.5 - 4 μm, marine
 Pyramimonas virginica Pennick, 2.7 - 3.5 μm, marine

Trebouxiophyceae
 Chlorella nana Andreoli et al., 1.5 - 3 μm, marine
 Picochlorum oklahomensis Henley et al., 2 - 2 μm, hypersaline
 Picochlorum atomus Henley et al., 2 - 3 μm, brackish
 Picochlorum eukaryotum Henley et al., 3 - 3 μm, marine
 Picochlorum maculatus Henley et al., 3 - 3 μm, brackish

Cryptophyta

Cryptophyceae
 Hillea marina Butcher, 1.5 - 2.5 μm, marine

Haptophyta

Prymnesiaceae
 Chrysochromulina tenuisquama Estep et al., 2 - 5 μm, marine
 Chrysochromulina minor Parke et Manton, 2.5 - 7.5 μm, marine
 Chrysochromulina apheles Moestrup et Thomsen, 3 - 4 μm, marine
 Dicrateria inornata Parke, 3 - 5.5 μm, marine
 Ericiolus spiculiger Thomsen, 3 - 3.8 μm, marine
 Imantonia rotunda Reynolds, 2 - 4 μm, marine
 Phaeocystis cordata Zingone, 3 - 4 μm, marine
 Phaeocystis pouchetii Lagerheim, 3 - 8 μm, marine
 Trigonaspis minutissima H.A.Thomsen, 2 - 3.6 μm, marine

Heterokontophyta (Stramenopiles)

Bacillariophyceae
 Minidiscus comicus Takano, 2 - 7 μm, marine
 Minidiscus trioculatus Hasle, 2.5 - 3.8 μm, marine
 Minidiscus spinulosus Gao, Chang et Chin, 3 - 5 μm, marine
 Minidiscus chilensis Rivera, 3 - 7.5 μm, marine
 Minutocellus polymorphus Hasle, von Stosch et Syverstsen, 2 - 30 μm, marine
 Minutocellus scriptus Hasle, von Stosch et Syverstsen, 3 - 36 μm, marine
 Skeletonema menzelii Guillard, Carpenter et Reimann, 2 - 7 μm, marine
 Skeletonema pseudocostatum Medlin, 2 - 9 μm, marine
 Skeletonema japonicum Zingone et Sarno, 2 - 10 μm, marine
 Skeletonema grethae Zingone et Sarno, 2 - 10.5 μm, marine
 Skeletonema marinoi Sarno et Zingone, 2 - 12 μm, marine
 Thalassiosira pseudonana Hasle et Heimdal, 2.3 - 5.5 μm, marine

Bolidophyceae
 Bolidomonas pacifica Guillou et Chrétiennot-Dinet, 1 - 1.7 μm, marine
 Bolidomonas mediterranea Guillou et Chrétiennot-Dinet, 1 - 1.7 μm, marine

Chrysophyceae
 Ollicola vangoorii Conrad (Vors), 2.5 - 5 μm, marine
 Tetraparma pelagica Booth et Marchant, 2.2 - 2.8 μm, marine
 Tetraparma insecta Bravo-Sierra et Hernández-Becerril, 2.8 - 3.8 μm, marine
 Triparma laevis Booth, 2.2 - 3.1 μm, marine
 Triparma columacea Booth, 2.3 - 4.7 μm, marine
 Triparma retinervis Booth, 2.7 - 4.5 μm, marine

Dictyochophyceae
 Florenciella parvula Eikrem, 3 - 6 μm, marine

Eustigmatophyceae
 Nannochloropsis granulata Karlson et Potter, 2 - 4 μm, marine
 Nannochloropsis salina Hibberd, 3 - 4 μm, brackish
 Nannochloropsis oceanica Suda et Miyashita, 3 - 5 μm, marine

Pelagophyceae
 Aureococcus anophagefferens Hargraves et Sieburth, 1.5 - 2 μm, marine
 Aureoumbra lagunensis Stockwell et al., 2.5 - 5 μm, marine
 Pelagococcus subviridis Norris, 2.5 - 5.5 μm, marine
 Pelagomonas calceolata Andersen et Saunders, 2 - 3 μm, marine

Pinguiophyceae
 Pinguiochrysis pyriformis Kawachi, 1 - 3 μm, marine
 Pinguiococcus pyrenoidosus Andersen et al., 3 - 8 μm, marin

Heterotrophic species

Cercozoa

Cercomonadida
 Massisteria marina Larsen et Patterson, 2.5 - 6.5 μm, marine

Plasmodiophorida
 Phagomyxa odontellae Kühn, Schnepf & Bulman, 3 - 4 μm, marine

Stramenopiles

Bicosoecida
 Caecitellus parvulus Patterson et al., 3 - 10 μm, marine
 Pseudobodo minima Ruinen, 2 μm, marine
 Symbiomonas scintillans Guillou et Chrétiennot-Dinet, 1.2 - 1.5 μm, marine

Chrysophyceae
 Paraphysomonas imperforata Lucas, 1.7 - 5.1 μm, marine
 Paraphysomonas corbidifera Pennick and Clarke, 2 - 3.25 μm, marine
 Paraphysomonas antarctica Takahashi, 2 - 4.3 μm, marine
 Paraphysomonas caelifrica Preisig and Hibberd, 2.5 - 5 μm, marine
 Paraphysomonas cribosa Lucas, 3 - 4 μm, marine
 Paraphysomonas sideriophora Thomsen, 3 - 5 μm, marine
 Paraphysomonas capreolata Preisig and Hibberd, 3 - 6.5 μm, marine
 Paraphysomonas gladiata Preisig and Hibberd, 3 - 8 μm, marine
 Picophagus flagellatus Guillou et Chrétiennot-Dinet, 1.4 - 2.5 μm, marine

Biological oceanography
Planktology
Aquatic ecology
Picoplankton